The One-Eyed is an epithet of:

 Horatius Cocles, Roman officer famed for defending a bridge against an army
 Antigonus I Monophthalmus (382–301 BC),  Macedonian nobleman, general, satrap and king, founder of the Antigonid dynasty
 John the One-Eyed, a secular priest murdered in 1233
 Sitric Cáech (died 927), Viking ruler of Dublin and Viking Northumbria
 Egbert the One-Eyed (died 994), German count
 Raymond IV, Count of Toulouse or Monoculus (c. 1041–1105), count of Toulouse
 John fitzRichard the One-Eyed or Monoculus (fl. 1076), Norman nobleman
 Reginald I, Count of Bar (c. 1080–1149) 
 Frederick II, Duke of Swabia (1090–1147)
 Peter Monoculus (d. 29 October 1185), Cistercian abbot
 Otto II, Duke of Brunswick-Göttingen (c. 1380–1463)
 Bogdan III the One-Eyed (1479–1517), Voivode of Moldavia

See also
 Xiahou Dun (died 220), Chinese general and politician known as "One-Eyed Xiahou"
 Iain "One-eye" Camm (fl. bef. 1390), second chief of Clan Gregor
Jan Žižka (d. 1424), Czech military leader known as "One-eyed Žižka"
 Date Masamune (1567–1636), Japanese daimyo (ruler) known as the "One-Eyed Dragon of Ōshu"
 Charley Parkhurst (1812–1879), American stagecoach driver also known as "One-Eyed Charlie"
 List of one-eyed creatures in mythology and fiction
 List of people known as the Blind

Lists of people by epithet